Brian J. Sears (born January 21, 1968, in Fort Lauderdale, Florida) is a driver of harness racing horses who in 2016 was elected to the Harness Racing Hall of Fame. He has won more than 9,600 races with purses in excess of $170 million. He was inducted to the Harness Racing Museum in Goshen, New York at July 2, 2017. On March 26, 2019, he was arrested for Battery after sexually assaulting a female at a restaurant in Deerfield Beach, FL.

References

1968 births
Living people
American harness racing trainers
United States Harness Racing Hall of Fame inductees
Dan Patch Award winners
Sportspeople from Fort Lauderdale, Florida